Paralebedella schultzei is a moth in the family Cossidae. It is found in the Democratic Republic of Congo, Niger and Sierra Leone.

This species has a wingspan of 27mm.

References

Natural History Museum Lepidoptera generic names catalog

Metarbelinae
Moths described in 1905